Supervivientes 2009: Perdidos en Honduras, was the sixth season of Supervivientes to air in Spain and the tenth season to air overall. This season was broadcast on the March 19, 2009 to June 11, 2009 on Telecinco. Jesus Vazquez acted as the Spanish presenter for this season while Mario Picazo acted as the host from Honduras. The initial twist for this season was that the contestants were split up into two tribes based on gender. Another twist that was put into place this season was that of the "Judas Kiss". When a contestant was eliminated that contestant could then use their Judas Kiss to vote for someone at the next tribal council.

Michel was supposed to be one of the final contestants but some days before the launch he was ejected for some objections with the producers. Roberto entered one day before the launch replacing Michel. Ultimately, it was Maite Zúñiga who won this season over Matías Fernández and Ivonne Orsini and took home the €200,000 prize as well as a car.

Finishing order

Nominations table 

: In week one, the contestants were split into two tribes based on their gender and nominated separately.
: As the winner of the immunity challenge, Álvaro was given the power to name a nominee.
: As the winner of the immunity challenge, Álvaro was given the power to name a nominee..
: As the winner of the immunity challenge, Álvaro was given the power to name a nominee..
: As the winner of the immunity challenge, Juanito was given the power to name a nominee.
: As the winner of the immunity challenge, Matías was given the power to name a nominee.
: As the winner of the immunity challenge, Álvaro was given the power to name a nominee, however, as a lighter was discovered in his possession he was stripped of this power and everyone was asked to nominate two people for elimination.
: As the winner of the immunity challenge, Yolanda was given the power to name a nominee.
: As the winner of the immunity challenge, Ivonne was given the power to name a nominee.
: As they lost the final immunity challenge, Ivonne, Maite, and Matías were automatically nominated for elimination.

External links
http://worldofbigbrother.com/Survivor/Spa/10/news14.shtml
http://www.fandemia.com/general/roberto-liano-el-primer-expulsado-de-supervivientes-2009

Survivor Spain seasons